Moodie is a surname. Notable people with the surname include:

 Alma Moodie (1898–1943), Australian violinist
 D. Aubrey Moodie (1908–2008), Canadian politician
 Benjamin Moodie (1789–1856), Scottish emigrant to the Cape Colony
 D. C. F. Moodie (1838–1891), South African writer who published a newspaper in South Australia
 Duncan Moodie (1897–1960), Australian rules footballer
 Erica Moodie, Canadian biostatistician
 George Moodie (b. 1872), Australian rules footballer
 Graeme Moodie (1924–2007), British political scientist
 Graham Moodie (b. 1981), Scottish field hockey player
 Janice Moodie (b. 1973), Scottish golfer
 Jason Moodie (b. 1974), Australian Rugby player
 Jim Moodie (1905–1980), Australian rules footballer
 Jim Moodie (motorcycle racer) (b. 1966), Scottish motorcycle racer
 John Moodie (1859–1944), Canadian textile manufacture
 John Wedderburn Dunbar Moodie (1797–1869), civil servant and writer in Canada, husband of Susannah
 Marion E. Moodie (1867–1958), Canadian nurse and botanist
 Peter Moodie (1892–1947), Scottish footballer
 Robert Moodie (disambiguation), people named Rob or Robert Moodie
 Rob Moodie (lawyer) (b. c. 1939),  New Zealand policeman and cross-dresser
 Rob Moodie (doctor) (b. 1953), Australian doctor and columnist
 Robert Moodie (British Army officer) (1778–1837), British army officer who settled in Canada
 Susanna Moodie (1803–1885), Canadian author
 Tanya Moodie, British actress
 Thomas Moodie (Rhodesian settler) (1839–1894)
 Thomas H. Moodie (1878–1948), 19th Governor of North Dakota 
 Wesley Moodie (1979), South African tennis player
 William Moodie (1759–1812), Scottish minister of religion and philologist

See also
 Moodie Hill, Gauteng, South Africa
 Moodie Island, Nunavut, Canada
 The Journals of Susanna Moodie, book of poetry by Margaret Atwood
Moody (disambiguation)
Moody (surname)
Mudie